The 1961–62 Cincinnati Bearcats men's basketball team represented University of Cincinnati. Cincinnati won the Missouri Valley Conference regular season title and defended its national championship with a 71–59 defeat of top-ranked Ohio State before 18,469 at Freedom Hall in Louisville, Kentucky. The head coach was Ed Jucker.

Roster

Schedule

|-
!colspan=12 style=|Regular Season

|-
!colspan=12 style=|NCAA Tournament

Rankings

Awards and honors

All-American
USBWA First Team: Paul Hogue
NABC, NEA Second Team: Paul Hogue
AP, NEA Third Team: Paul Hogue

National honors
Helms Foundation College Basketball Player of the Year: Paul Hogue

Missouri Valley Conference honors

All-MVC
Paul Hogue
Tom Thacker
Ron Bonham

Source

NBA Draft

In the spring of 1962, Cleveland Pipers owner George Steinbrenner signed Jerry Lucas to a player-management contract worth forty thousand dollars. With the Lucas signing, Steinbrenner had a secret deal with NBA commissioner Maurice Podoloff. The Pipers would merge with the Kansas City Steers and join the NBA. A schedule was printed for the 1963–64 NBA season with the Pipers playing the New York Knicks in the first game. Steinbrenner and partner George McKean fell behind in payments to the NBA and the deal was cancelled.

References

Cincinnati Bearcats
Cincinnati Bearcats men's basketball seasons
NCAA Division I men's basketball tournament championship seasons
NCAA Division I men's basketball tournament Final Four seasons
Cincinnati
Cincinnati Bearcats men's basketball
Cincinnati Bearcats men's basketball
1962 in American sports